The discography of French singer, songwriter, and producer Christine and the Queens consists of three studio albums, 11 extended plays, 19 singles, five promotional singles, and fifteen music videos.

Studio albums

Extended plays

Singles

As lead artist

As featured artist

Promotional singles

Other charted songs

Guest appearances

Music videos

Notes

References

Discographies of French artists
Pop music discographies